Jössefors is a locality situated in Arvika Municipality, Värmland County, Sweden with 732 inhabitants in 2010.

References 

Populated places in Värmland County
Populated places in Arvika Municipality